Sanghera may refer to:

Places 
 Sanghera (village), a village in Punjab, India

People 
 Jasvinder Sanghera (born 1965), British activist
 Mandy Sanghera, British human rights activist
 Sathnam Sanghera (born 1976), British journalist
 Sukh Sanghera, Canadian film and music video director